Vonovia is a European multinational real estate company based in Bochum, North Rhine-Westphalia. Its history goes back to Deutsche Annington, which merged with GAGFAH and was subsequently renamed Vonovia. The company currently owns around 400,000 apartments in Germany, Sweden, and Austria, making it a significant market player in these countries. Vonovia is a member of the DAX 40 and STOXX Europe 600 blue-chip indexes.

History

Early years 
At the end of the 1990s, the German government decided to privatize railway workers' homes as part of the railway reform. The Japanese financial group Nomura Holdings and its subsidiary Deutsche Annington (named after Annington Homes from Great Britain) sought to acquire them. After years of negotiations, the company finally received a significant share in 2000. The company responded to criticism of the sale with extensive exclusive rights, such as a lifetime right of residence and a restriction on rent increases. Besides, tenants were allowed to purchase their property. In the following years, Deutsche Annington invested in further smaller stocks of railway workers' apartments, which had previously remained in the ownership of the federal government.

Acquisitions 
Deutsche Annington took over several smaller holdings, for example, from Allianz and RWE. In 2003, the E.ON energy group also put its real estate business up for sale under the name Viterra. With the acquisition of over 150,000 apartments, Deutsche Annington became the market leader in Germany. It was the largest transaction of its kind in the country's history, which met with criticism from unions and tenant protection associations alike. In the course of this, Terra Firma Capital Partner's majority shareholding in Deutsche Annington was repeatedly brought up as a central theme.

Deutsche Annington achieved its returns with a combination of renting and selling apartments. It was instrumental in shaping the concept of socially responsible tenant privatization. In this way, the company wanted to raise funds to expand its portfolio to half a million and later even to one million apartments. In 2007, Deutsche Annington announced that it would again turn away from tenant privatization. From then on, the company concentrated on smaller acquisitions, such as the Sparkassen-Finanzgruppe's subsidiary Corpus.

Going public 
In 2010, the profit of Deutsche Annington exceeded the 500 million euro mark for the first time. Nevertheless, the global economic and financial crisis made access to cheap debt capital more difficult. Refinancing became one of the main problems of the entire real estate industry. For this reason, an IPO was back on the agenda. To this end, the company hired Rolf Buch, a former member of the Bertelsmann executive board, as CEO. He emphasized above all the size of the company as a distinguishing feature. The rise in key interest rates dampened the interest of potential investors so that the IPO had to be postponed several times. In 2013, Deutsche Annington finally placed its shares on the Frankfurt Stock Exchange with a lower volume and a reduced issue price. Two years later, the company became the first representative of the real estate industry to be included in the DAX, the index of the largest listed stock corporations in Germany.

Vonovia origins 
The media had already reported on Deutsche Annington's interest in GAGFAH in 2003. At the end of 2014, Deutsche Annington then officially offered to take over the competitor for around 3.9 billion euros to create a leading residential property group in Europe. Following the approval of the shareholders and the antitrust authorities, the transaction was completed ahead of schedule in March 2015. In 2015, the annual General Meeting voted to rename the company Vonovia to modernize its external image. The administrative and statutory headquarters were moved to the new offices in Bochum.

European expansion 
In contrast, initially Vonovia failed with its 2015 offer for Deutsche Wohnen, but at least prevented Deutsche Wohnen's planned merger with LEG Immobilien. The company then turned to the neighboring states: A strategic partnership was agreed with the French housing company Société Nationale Immobilière (now CNC Habitat) in 2017. The acquisition of Conwert Immobilien and BUWOG made Vonovia the leading real estate group in Austria in 2018. In the same year, the company exceeded the threshold of 50% of the shares in the Swedish housing company Victoria Park, which has been 100% owned by Vonovia since 2019. Vonovia expanded its position there by acquiring its Swedish rival Hembla.
A renewed attempt at taking over Deutsche Wohnen in May 2021 was approved by the Federal Cartel Office but stalled when the 50% threshold was not met at first. Only the third offer from August 2021 resulted in more than 60% acceptances, thus successfully completing the takeover.

Company 
Vonovia is a European stock company (Societas Europaea, SE for short). Its shares are traded on the regulated market (Prime Standard) of the Frankfurt Stock Exchange. They are part of the DAX and listed in the STOXX Europe, MSCI Germany, and EPRA, for example. According to the Deutsche Börse definition, more than 90% are in free float. Vonovia's largest shareholders include the American fund company BlackRock (7.5%) and the Norwegian central bank Norges Bank (6.6%). The majority of investors are pension funds, sovereign wealth funds, international asset managers, and other long-term investors. There are also individual shareholders.

The company's constitution follows the dual system of an executive board ("Vorstand") and a controlling body board ("Aufsichtsrat"). Currently, Vonovia is managed by Rolf Buch (Chairman and Chief Executive Officer), Arnd Fittkau, Helene von Roeder, and Daniel Riedl. The supervisory board of Vonovia has twelve members, led by Jürgen Fitschen, former Co-Chairman of the management board of Deutsche Bank.

Portfolio 
According to the annual report 2019, Vonovia owned 416,236 residential units, 138,176 garages and parking spaces, as well as 6,748 commercial units. These extended to 653 domestic and foreign cities and municipalities. Based on a total fair market value of more than 52 billion euros, the vast majority of the portfolio was located in Germany (84%), with the remainder in Sweden (11%), and Austria (5%). Also, 78,691 apartments were managed by Vonovia on behalf of third parties.

Controversy 

As of 27 September 2021 Vonovia owns the majority of shares in German real estate company Deutsche Wohnen. Deutsche Wohnen announced a voluntary public takeover offer. The consolidation of Deutsche Wohnen and Vonovia would significantly increase its market share in states like Berlin. In a public referendum held one day earlier, the majority of Berliners decided in favour of nationalising the housing stocks of large residential property companies. Vonovia CEO Rolf Buch responded to the referendum outcome by saying "Expropriation won't solve the many challenges in Berlin's housing market. In view of such major challenges, Berlin cannot afford years of deadlock ". Vonovia and Deutsche Wohnen agreed to sell 14,000 apartments to the state of Berlin.

Sustainability 
The German landlord reports their contribution to the UN SDG's like CO2 neutrality. Every year targets are formulated and the sustainability performance is reported on. This data is audited by the statutory auditor.

In September 2021 Vonovia announced plans for solar panels on 30,000 roofs by 2050. As of September 2021 only over a 1000 roofs are equipped with solar panels despite supporting the SDG climate goals confirm the UN COP21 Paris Agreement.

References

External links 

 

Companies based in Bochum
German companies established in 2001
Real estate companies established in 2001
Real estate companies of Germany
Companies listed on the Frankfurt Stock Exchange
Companies in the Euro Stoxx 50